Ricco Fajardo is an American voice actor who has provided voices for English versions of Japanese anime series and video games. Some of his roles include Taiju Oki in Dr. Stone, Itona Horibe in Assassination Classroom, Mirio Togata in My Hero Academia, Kotaro Tatsumi in Zombie Land Saga, Daryun in The Heroic Legend of Arslan, Tor Kokonoe in Absolute Duo, Leon Luis in Garo: The Animation, Kyousuke Munakata in Danganronpa 3: The End of Hope's Peak Academy and Haruhiro in Grimgar of Fantasy and Ash.

Filmography

Anime

Animation

Film

Video games

References

External links

Living people
American male video game actors
American male voice actors
Place of birth missing (living people)
21st-century American male actors
American male stage actors
Hispanic and Latino American male actors
Twitch (service) streamers
Year of birth missing (living people)